Gateway Mall may refer to:

United States
 The Gateway (Salt Lake City), an open-air mall in Utah
 Gateway Fashion Mall, an enclosed mall in Bismarck, North Dakota
 Gateway Town Center (Gateway Mall), a shopping center in Jacksonville, Florida
 Prescott Gateway, a shopping mall in Prescott, Arizona
 Gateway Mall (Springfield, Oregon)
 Gateway Mall (Lincoln, Nebraska), a shopping mall in Lincoln, Nebraska
 Gateway Center Mall, an outdoor shopping mall in the Spring Creek neighborhood of Brooklyn, New York
 St. Louis Gateway Mall, the strip of land in downtown St. Louis, Missouri, from the Gateway Arch to Union Station

Elsewhere
 Gateway Mall (Prince Albert, Saskatchewan), an enclosed mall in Prince Albert, Saskatchewan, Canada
 Gateway Mall (Quezon City), Cubao, Quezon City, Philippines

See also
 Gateway Theatre of Shopping, Umhlanga, KwaZulu-Natal